Flicker: Featuring the RTÉ Concert Orchestra is the first live album from Irish singer and songwriter Niall Horan. It was released on 7 December 2018 by Virgin EMI Records. The album peaked at number 12 on the Irish Albums Chart and number 40 on the Australian Digital Albums Chart.

Background
In April 2018, Horan and the RTÉ Concert Orchestra recorded songs from Horan's debut studio album Flicker. The recording formed the basis of a one-off TV special, broadcast in early 2018.

Critical reception
Louise Bruton of The Irish Times gave the album four stars: "Cleared of overproduction and an overly soft rock touch, [Horan's] voice is more confident and it takes the leads as the orchestra complements his songs".

Track listing

Notes
All tracks feature the RTÉ Concert Orchestra.

Charts

Release history

References

2018 live albums
Niall Horan albums